Alibi.com is a 2017 French comedy film. It is directed by Philippe Lacheau.

Plot 
Grégory Van Huffel, called Greg, is the head of Alibi.com, an agency for cheating people. The agency provides the infidelities with the alibi they need to keep their affairs secret from their partners.

Greg meets lawyer Florence Martin by chance. While his company is growing successfully, Grégory falls in love with Florence, who, due to bad experiences, considers honesty to be the greatest good in a relationship. That's why Greg hides his job and says he's a steward.

During a trip to their parents' country house together, Greg discovers that Florence's father Gérard is one of his customers at Alibi.com. While Florence's mother, Marlène, assumes that her husband is on a business trip, Gérard meets with Cynthia in a hotel in Cannes. Various circumstances mean that Florence and her mother also check into the hotel in Cannes, where they meet Gérard. In an emergency, Gérard contacts Greg. To get Gérard's alibi, Greg had to pretend to Florence that he was traveling to Tanzania. So under no circumstances should he run into her ...

In the end, Gérard and Greg become repentant sinners, while Cynthia publishes Alibi.com's customer list on the Internet.

Cast 

 Philippe Lacheau as Grégory Van Huffel
 Élodie Fontan as Flo Martin
 Julien Arruti as Augustin
 Tarek Boudali as Mehdi
 Didier Bourdon as Gérard Martin
 Nathalie Baye as Madame Martin
 Nawell Madani as Cynthia
 Philippe Duquesne as Maurice
 Medi Sadoun as Garcia
 Vincent Desagnat as Romain
 Alice Dufour as Clara
 Jo Prestia as Prosper
 Michèle Laroque as Françoise
 Norman Thavaud as Paul-Edouard
 Joeystarr as MC Stocma
 Kad Merad as Monsieur Godet
 Valériane de Villeneuve as Madame Godet
 Chantal Ladesou as The veterinarian
 La Fouine as himself
 François-Xavier Ménage as himself
 Norbert Godji as Doudou
 Samy Naceri as The taxi driver

 Arnaud Makunga as MC Stocma's boyfriend

Reception

Box office 
Alibi.com has grossed $29.3 million worldwide against a production budget of $7.6 million.

Critical response 
On review aggregator Rotten Tomatoes, the film has an approval rating of 67% based on 6 reviews, with an average rating of 5.1/10.

Remake
An Italian remake entitled L'agenzia dei bugiardi was released in January 2019.

References

External links 
 
 

2017 films
2010s French-language films
French comedy films
2017 comedy films
Films directed by Philippe Lacheau
2010s French films